Ocresia bisinualis is a species of snout moth, and the type species in the genus Ocresia. It was described by Ragonot in 1891. It is found in Brazil.

References

Moths described in 1891
Chrysauginae
Taxa named by Émile Louis Ragonot